Balimela Wildlife Sanctuary is a wildlife sanctuary in Malkangiri district, Odisha, India.

It covers an area of 160 km². The terrain is hilly, and covered with mixed deciduous forests. It is in the Eastern Highlands moist deciduous forests ecoregion.

References

Eastern Highlands moist deciduous forests
Wildlife sanctuaries in Odisha
Malkangiri district
Protected areas with year of establishment missing